George P. Frank (June 11, 1852 – August 24, 1896) served as mayor of Portland, Oregon from 1894 to 1896.

The October 18, 2012, edition of the Portland Mercury listed Frank as the Third Worst Mayor in Portland history because he "handily won the election thanks to a flood that kept voter turnout low while he paid drunken repeat voters with free booze to cast ballots in every precinct they could."

Family

Frank's father was Alfred S. Frank, and he had two brothers, Alfred and Fred, and one sister, Jennie. He predeceased his father, who died in January 1908.

References

1852 births
1896 deaths
19th-century American politicians
Mayors of Portland, Oregon
Oregon Republicans
People from Granville, New York